Barnett Field was a baseball ballpark located in Fargo, North Dakota, United States. The field, named after area attorney William H. Barnett, was a Works Progress Administration project that hosted its first games in 1936. It was home to the Fargo-Moorhead Twins, a minor league baseball team, until 1960. It was demolished in 1963. Fargo North High School was built in its place.

External links
Barnett Field gallery

References

Defunct sports venues in North Dakota
Defunct minor league baseball venues
Works Progress Administration in North Dakota
Buildings and structures in Fargo, North Dakota
1936 establishments in North Dakota
Sports venues completed in 1936
1963 disestablishments in North Dakota
Sports venues demolished in 1963
Demolished sports venues in the United States
Baseball venues in North Dakota
Sports in Fargo, North Dakota